Scott Andrew Edwards (born 23 August 1996) is an Australian-Dutch cricketer who represents the Netherlands. He made his first-class debut for the Netherlands against Namibia in the 2015–17 ICC Intercontinental Cup on 29 November 2017. He made his List A debut for the Netherlands against Namibia in the 2015–17 ICC World Cricket League Championship on 8 December 2017. In June 2022, Edwards was named as the new captain of the Dutch cricket team, after Pieter Seelaar was forced to retire from international cricket due to a long-term back injury. Edwards is the Netherlands seventh ODI captain.

Early and domestic career
Edwards was born in Tonga, where his father was working at the time, but grew up in Australia. He qualified for the Netherlands through his Dutch grandmother, and holds dual citizenship of Australia and the Netherlands. In Australia he has played club cricket for Monash Tigers in Victorian Premier Cricket, and previously for Blackburn South Cricket Club and Highton Cricket Club. In Dutch club cricket he plays for Excelsior '20. Throughout this period, Edwards formed a relationship with former Australian wicketkeeper Ryan Campbell, who later became head coach of the Netherlands Cricket Team in 2017. He was an electrical apprentice before he began playing cricket professionally. He said "It was pretty surreal to be honest, was going about life as an apprentice and then all of a sudden you’re playing international cricket coming up against Chris Gayle and Evin Lewis — it was pretty exciting".

In July 2019, he was selected to play for the Rotterdam Rhinos in the inaugural edition of the Euro T20 Slam cricket tournament. However, the following month the tournament was cancelled.

International career
In June 2018, he was named in the Netherlands' Twenty20 International (T20I) squad for the 2018 Netherlands Tri-Nation Series. He made his T20I debut for the Netherlands against Ireland on 12 June 2018.

In July 2018, he was named in the Netherlands' One Day International (ODI) squad, for their series against Nepal. He made his ODI debut for the Netherlands against Nepal on 1 August 2018.

In July 2019, taking part in the 2019 European Cricket League, Edwards achieved the world record for the fastest T10 century and the highest individual T10 score, with 137 not out off 39 balls. In September 2019, he was named in the Dutch squad for the 2019 ICC T20 World Cup Qualifier tournament in the United Arab Emirates. Ahead of the tournament, the International Cricket Council (ICC) named him as the player to watch in the Dutch squad. In April 2020, he was one of seventeen Dutch-based cricketers to be named in the team's senior squad. The following month, Edwards was named as the captain of the Netherlands A team ahead of their matches against the Ireland Wolves. In September 2021, Edwards was named in the Dutch squad for the 2021 ICC Men's T20 World Cup.

In June 2022, Edwards scored three consecutive ODI half centuries against England at VRA Ground, Amsterdam.

In July 2022, Netherlands beat USA in the semi finals of the ICC Men's T20 World Cup Qualifier. This sent them through to Round 1 of the 2022 ICC Men's T20 World Cup in Australia.

Personal life
In 2022, Edwards was studying for a Bachelor of Business (Sport Management)	at Deakin University.

References

Further reading

External links
 

1996 births
Living people
Australian cricketers
Dutch cricketers
Netherlands One Day International cricketers
Netherlands Twenty20 International cricketers
Place of birth missing (living people)
Dutch people of Australian descent
Australian people of Dutch descent
Cricketers from Melbourne
Sportsmen from Victoria (Australia)